Charles Emanuel Bellringer (1864–1944) was a Reform Party Member of Parliament.

He won the Taranaki electorate in New Zealand from the Liberals in the 1925 general election, but was defeated in 1928. The seat was abolished in 1928, and replaced by New Plymouth.

In 1935, he was awarded the King George V Silver Jubilee Medal.

References

1864 births
1944 deaths
Members of the New Zealand House of Representatives
New Zealand MPs for North Island electorates
Reform Party (New Zealand) MPs
Unsuccessful candidates in the 1911 New Zealand general election
Unsuccessful candidates in the 1922 New Zealand general election
Unsuccessful candidates in the 1928 New Zealand general election